Sorriso is a municipality in the state of Mato Grosso, Brazil.

Sorriso  may also refer to:

Sorriso Airport, airport in Sorriso, Mato Grosso
Sorriso Esporte Clube, Brazilian football club in Sorriso, Mato Grosso
Sorriso Maroto, Brazil pagode band formed in 1997
Sorriso (footballer) (born 2001), Marcos Vinicios Lopes Moura, Brazilian footballer
Sorriso nucleare, 2003 album by Italian artist Dolcenera